Chill Out, Scooby-Doo! is a 2007 animated direct-to-DVD comedy mystery film, and the eleventh in the Scooby-Doo direct-to-video film series, produced by Warner Bros. Animation which began in late 2006. It premiered on Cartoon Network on August 31, 2007 as the first premiere on the first week of the Fried Dynamite block, then released to DVD on September 4, 2007. The film is dedicated to Iwao Takamoto, a character designer for Hanna-Barbera who died on January 8, 2007, 7 months before the film's Cartoon Network premiere, and 8 months before the film's home video release.

Plot
On a climbing expedition in the Himalayas to search for Shangri-La, Professor Jeffries, a college professor is led by his Sherpa, Pemba, to a high point on a mountain using an ancient tablet. Pemba refuses to lead Jeffries into forbidden territory, as it would be intruding on the territory of the Abominable Snowman. Jeffries, who seems to care more about the expedition over their safety, decides to cut the rope and continue alone. As soon as Jeffries fades from view, Pemba sees the outline of a large creature in front of him.

Meanwhile, Fred, Daphne and Velma are on vacation in Paris. Daphne later is disappointed when Fred has a cell phone and Velma has newspapers to read.
Velma finds out The Abominable Snowman, a yeti believed to exist in the Himalayas has haunted 
Mount Everest. However, Scooby-Doo and Shaggy have not arrived yet, and the gang wonders where they are at. Shaggy and Scooby are in a small plane that they think is going to Paris, but it is really going to the Himalayas to drop off Alphonse LaFleur, a French hunter and trapper. LaFleur wants to find and kill the Snowman, and is taking Shaggy and Scooby along as bait. LaFleur then locks Shaggy and Scooby up with his equipment, and throws them off the plane. Shaggy, realizing they are not going to Paris, manages to get a quick phone call through to Fred before the phone goes dead. Fred uses the GPS on his phone to track them. He finds out they are in the Himalayas and The Abominable Snowman has spotted there and then he, Daphne and Velma head to the Himalayas to find them.

Meanwhile, Shaggy and Scooby manage to land near a small village on the mountain, where Professor Jeffries and Pemba currently are after escaping the Snowman.  Many of the other villagers are leaving, fearing the creature and its wrath. Shaggy and Scooby go to the High Lama to ask for a phone to call their friends. The High Lama, who tells them there is only a phone on the weather station nearby. Shaggy and Scooby discover room in the village with a statue of the Snowman holding a very large crystal, which the High Lama says it protects the villagers from the Abominable Snowman's powers, and Professor Jeffries takes in interest in the crystal. They then meet Pemba's sister Minga, who has decided to stay in the village. Pemba tells her to leave the village, and he, Shaggy, Scooby and Jeffries (who says that everyone should stick together), decide to go to the weather station to contact the rest of the gang. LaFleur arrives, and decides to accompany them.

As they travel, Minga runs up to them and says that she heard on the radio that a big storm is approaching. Shaggy wonders how there could be any radio reception so high up, and Pemba tells him there isn't, as it's just the weather station man pretending to be a DJ. Pemba realizes that Minga has a crush on the weatherman and deduces that she's just tagging along with them as an excuse to meet him. Minga denies this, and explains that there really is a storm coming. Everyone looks up and sees a dark cloud, and they decide to set up camp to wait out the storm. During the night, Jeffries gets out of his tent and leaves with his sled, which is filled with TNT and other explosives. Some time later, the Snowman attacks Shaggy and Scooby. LaFleur tries to capture the Snowman, but fails when all his traps backfire on the Snowman, instead working on him. Scooby and Shaggy manage to lose the Snowman but get lost themselves. However, they are relieved to see a snowplow approach them. In the snowplow is Del Chillman, whom the gang had met before. Del takes them to the weather station, where he works. Chillman tells them he decided to take the job so he could find out if the legend of the creature is true. He also reveals that he's the DJ/weatherman. He had the radio just to do weather reports, but plays songs to pass the time.

Meanwhile, Fred, Daphne and Velma are on their way to the village. Daphne tells Fred that they're lost and they are taking a shortcut across Mongolia. Velma tells Fred that it's abominable after Fred mistakes abominable. Velma tells Daphne that the yeti is the word used by the Himalayan locals to describe the creature. Velma tells Fred that it's not subliminal and it’s abominable. They later arrive at the village, which is totally deserted. They follow Shaggy's tracks and see where the party camped the night before, and also the footprints of the Snowman. Velma notes that they are not very deep in the snow. They find Pemba, who was caught by one of LaFleur's traps. Minga is nowhere to be found and Jeffries is still gone, so the gang decides to split up and search for everyone else. At the weather station, Del goes out to look for the others. Once he leaves, the Snowman appears and attacks Shaggy and Scooby. As they run away, LaFleur shows up, tries to capture the creature, and struggles to save Shaggy and Scooby, but fails, and falls off a cliff, apparently to his death. Scooby and Shaggy manage to escape and find their way to the lost kingdom of Shangri-La, but are pursued by the Snowman.

Del catches up to the rest of the gang, but finds the weather station destroyed and some helium tanks missing. As Scooby and Shaggy walk around the city, the Abominable Snowman appears and chases them. Daphne and Pemba find a large cave and go inside, and conclude that is where the Snowman lives. They also find an empty helium case. Shaggy and Scooby lose the Snowman again, and everyone meets up in an old mine, each coming from a different direction. There, they see Jeffries mining for crystals like the one on the Yeti statue. They capture him and conclude he is the Snowman, although he denies it. Then the Snowman appears and chases everyone, while Jeffries gets free and follows them. The Snowman chases Shaggy, Scooby, and Jeffries through the caves and down the mountain. Jeffries attempts to get the crystals in the mine cart that Scooby and Shaggy are riding in. The rest of the gang prepares a trap for the Snowman, but Shaggy, Scooby and Jeffries get caught in it. An avalanche started by one of Professor Jeffries TNT sticks set off during the chase and almost crushes Velma and Del, but the Snowman saves them at the last moment. The Snowman is revealed to be Minga, who has been behind the mystery from the very beginning. She used the helium to fly, which caused the footprints to not be as deep. Minga confesses that she did it so that Del wouldn't leave and stop broadcasting his radio show (also her way of admitting that she has feelings for Del). Del's touched by what Minga says, and finds it romantic. Jeffries is taken to jail because he was illegally mining the crystals. The gang wonders if there really is a Snowman, but then LaFleur appears and tells them that something saved him from his fall and brought him to the village (presumably the real Snowman).

The gang, along with Del and Minga (who are now boyfriend and girlfriend), return to Paris for their vacation. Unfortunately, Fred gets on the wrong plane and ends up in the Amazon. The others go to find Fred, with Daphne complaining, "I'd like to have a vacation that actually stays a vacation."

Voice cast
 Frank Welker as Scooby-Doo and Fred Jones
 Casey Kasem as Shaggy Rogers
 Mindy Cohn as Velma Dinkley
 Grey DeLisle as Daphne Blake
 James Sie as Pemba Sherpa
 Jeff Bennett as Del Chillman and Pilot
 René Auberjonois as Alphonse LaFleur
 Alfred Molina as Professor Jeffries
 Kim Mai Guest as Minga Sherpa
 James Hong as The High Lama

References

External links
 

2000s American animated films
2000s children's animated films
2000s comedy mystery films
2007 animated films
2007 comedy films
2007 direct-to-video films
2007 films
American children's animated comedy films
American children's animated mystery films
American comedy mystery films
Films about cryptids
Films directed by Joe Sichta
Films set in the Himalayas
Scooby-Doo direct-to-video animated films
Warner Bros. Animation animated films
Warner Bros. direct-to-video animated films
Films about Yeti
2000s English-language films